Raksha Holla (born 26 January 1991) is an Indian television actress who predominantly work in Tamil and Kannada television. She is best known for her role as Devi Mayan in the Indian Tamil soap opera Naam Iruvar Namakku Iruvar.

Early life
She was born on 26 January 1991 in Kundapur, Karnataka. She did her Schooling in Nalanda International Public School, Hosur and completed her college Degree in Bangalore.

In 2018, she married her long time boyfriend Rakesh.

She currently resides in Chennai, Tamil Nadu with her spouse Rakesh who she married in 2018.

Career
She Started her career in Modelling at the age of 22. She made her acting debut in the Kannada television serial Puttinti Pattu Cheera, directed by Rasidh Pedha. Then, She appeared in well known Kannada television serials includes Pallavi Anupallavi, Milana, Kogile, and Maya.

She Made her Film debut with Kannada movie Ricky in 2016 and She appeared in Kannada Movies include Tarak (2017) and Aa Eradu Varshagalu (2017).

She also made her Tamil television debut with the mythology show Tamil Kadavul Murugan in Star Vijay. She also was doing the leading role in Naam Iruvar Namakku Iruvar serial which also aired on Star Vijay. She late went on to act in the Kannada serial Bayasade Balli Bande which aired on Star Suvarna.

Filmography

Television

Films
 Ricky as Kaavya (2016)
 Tarak as Gauri (2017)
 Aa Eradu Varshagalu  as Padmavathy (2017)

References

External links
 

Living people
Indian television actresses
Indian film actresses
Actresses from Bangalore
21st-century Indian actresses
1991 births